"My Culture" is a song by British trip hop duo 1 Giant Leap released as the first single from their debut album, 1 Giant Leap on 8 April 2002. The track features vocals from Maxi Jazz and Robbie Williams. The song peaked at No. 9 in the United Kingdom and charted within the top 40 in Australia, Italy, the Netherlands, and New Zealand. The first few lines of Williams' lyrics are the same as a part of the hidden track "Hello Sir" from his debut album, Life thru a Lens.

Music video
The music video starts with a comet crashing into a planet creating a universe and human civilisation as the Earth continues to rapidly evolve further in time. At the end of the video many children from different cultures walk into a building shaped rocket which launches up into space.

Track listing
 "My Culture" (radio edit) (featuring Maxi Jazz and Robbie Williams) – 3:43
 "My Culture" (We Love This Mix) (featuring Maxi Jazz and Robbie Williams) – 5:40
 "Racing Away" – 5:59
 "My Culture" (Enhanced video) (featuring Maxi Jazz and Robbie Williams) – 3:50

Charts

Weekly charts

Year-end charts

Release history

References

2002 debut singles
2002 songs
Robbie Williams songs
Songs written by Maxi Jazz
Songs written by Nigel Butler
Songs written by Robbie Williams